The Capron Park Zoo is a small  zoo that opened in 1937 in Attleboro, Massachusetts, United States. It is home to about 100 animals representing 44 species,  Capron Park Zoo is an accredited member of the Association of Zoos and Aquariums (AZA) and Association of Zoo and Aquarium Docents (AZAD). It participates in the Species Survival Plan program.

History
The zoo was renovated in the late 1980s and reopened in May 1990. A new children's education department opened in 1991. The Capron Park Zoo offers the public educational programs and recreational activities dedicated to furthering the understanding of animals.

Education
The education department for children opened in 1991, a year after the renovated zoo opened. The education department promotes environmental education, and teaches children about the interaction between animals, and how the zoo works.
The Capron Park Zoo keepers are also very helpful in assisting.  They will answer any questions you may have.

Exhibits
Exhibits include North and South American, Asian, African, and Australian animals such as agouti, emu, green tree python, kangaroo, lemur, white lion, meerkats, sloth bear, and Amur leopard.

The zoo includes a nocturnal building, where day and night are reversed so that visitors can see the nocturnal animals, and an indoor rainforest exhibit with porcupine, fruit bats, a two-toed sloth, and many birds.

References

External links

Zoos in Massachusetts
Buildings and structures in Bristol County, Massachusetts
Tourist attractions in Bristol County, Massachusetts